Tsuga Dam is a dam in Kōchi Prefecture, Japan, completed in 1944.

References 

Dams in Kōchi Prefecture
Dams completed in 1944